
Restaurant Les Quatre Saisons is a defunct restaurant in Zuidlaren, in the Netherlands. It was a fine dining restaurant that was awarded one Michelin star in 1981 and retained that rating until 1985.

The restaurant closed before 1993, as the Michelin Guide mentioned the later also starred restaurant De Vlindertuin at that address.

The restaurant was located in a renovated Saxonian farmhouse built in 1719. It is the same building that later housed the Michelin starred restaurant De Vlindertuin.

See also
List of Michelin starred restaurants in the Netherlands

References 

Restaurants in the Netherlands
Michelin Guide starred restaurants in the Netherlands